The 1948 Summer Olympics (also known as the Games of the XIV Olympiad) was an international multi-sport event held from July 29 through August 14, 1948, in London, United Kingdom. It was the first Olympic Games to take place in twelve years, due to the Second World War (and was known informally as "The Austerity Games" - largely due to countries having to bring their own food due to shortages in Britain), with London being chosen as the host city in May 1946. 

London had previously hosted the 1908 Summer Olympics, and was due to have hosted the event in 1944. A record 59 nations were represented by 4,104 athletes, 3,714 men and 385 women, in 19 sport disciplines. Following the Second World War, Germany and Japan remained under military occupation and had not yet formed their National Olympic Committee, and so were not invited. The only major Axis power to take part in the Games was Italy. The Soviet Union was invited to compete, but chose not to send any athletes, sending observers instead to prepare for the 1952 Summer Olympics. Following the threats of a boycott from Arab countries should an Israeli team fly their flag at the opening ceremony, the International Olympic Committee (IOC) excluded Israel from the Games on a technicality. 

Several countries participated for the first time, including Burma, Ceylon, Lebanon, Puerto Rico and Syria. The Olympic medals themselves were the standard Trionfo design used for the Olympic medals between 1928 and 1968.

It was not until 2010 that Belgian Eugène Van Roosbroeck received his gold medal for his part in the cycling road race as there was no podium for winners following the race and the team returned to Belgium two days after the event having received no medals.

Medal table

This is the full table of the medal count of the 1948 Summer Olympics, based on the medal count of the IOC. These rankings sort by the number of gold medals earned by a nation. The number of silver medals is taken into consideration next and then the number of bronze medals. If, after the above, countries are still tied, equal ranking is given and they are listed alphabetically. This information is provided by the IOC. However, the IOC does not recognize or endorse any ranking system.

In the gymnastics events there were three athletes placed first for the men's pommel horse, with Paavo Aaltonen, Veikko Huhtanen and Heikki Savolainen all receiving gold medals for Finland in the same event, while no silver or bronze medals were handed out. Meanwhile, in the men's vault, three athletes finished in joint third place and so were awarded a bronze medal each, resulting in five medals being handed out for that one event.

Mexico and Peru won their first gold medal.

References

External links

 
 
 
 
 

Medal count
1948
United Kingdom sport-related lists